The Diário de Marília (English: Diary of Marilia) is a Brazilian newspaper based in Marília, São Paulo, Brazil, which covers news about the city.

References

External links 
  

Newspapers published in Brazil